Julius Kiptum Rop (born 1977) is a long-distance runner from Kenya. On a windy April 17, 2005, Rop made his marathon debut in Germany, at the Leipzig Marathon, with a 2:16:22 win. Poland's Artur Blasinki finished a distant second in 2:19:24, Wilson Kipngetich (Kenya) third in 2:19:36.

Achievements

External links

 Profile Marathon Info

1977 births
Living people
Place of birth missing (living people)
Kenyan male long-distance runners
Kenyan male marathon runners